Sybil Wolfram (born Sybille Misch; 1931–1993) was an English philosopher and writer, of German Jewish origin. She was a Fellow and Tutor in philosophy at Lady Margaret Hall at University of Oxford from 1964 to 1993.

Work
She published two books, Philosophical Logic: An Introduction (1989) and In-laws and Outlaws: Kinship and Marriage in England (1987). She was the translator of Claude Lévi-Strauss's La pensée sauvage (The Savage Mind), but later disavowed the translation when she discovered the publisher had made changes to the translation that neither she nor Lévi-Strauss had authorized. She was the daughter of criminologist and psychoanalyst Kate Friedlander (1902–1949), an expert on the subject of juvenile delinquency, and the physician Walter Misch (1889–1943) who, together, wrote Die vegetative Genese der neurotischen Angst und ihre medikamentöse Beseitigung. After the Reichstag fire in 1933, she emigrated from Berlin, Germany to England with her parents and Jewish psychoanalyst, Paula Heimann (1899–1982).

See also
 Particular
 Truth-bearer

References

1931 births
1993 deaths
Fellows of Lady Margaret Hall, Oxford
German women novelists
Jewish philosophers
Jewish women writers
Jewish emigrants from Nazi Germany to the United Kingdom
20th-century English philosophers
20th-century German women